Qatruyeh Rural District is a rural district (dehestan) in Qatruyeh District, Neyriz County, Fars Province, Iran. At the 2006 census, its population (including Qatruyeh, which was subsequently detached from the rural district and promoted to city status) was 4,242, in 1,138 families; excluding Qatruyeh, the population in 2006 was 1,494, in 370 families.  The rural district has 23 villages.

References 

Rural Districts of Fars Province
Neyriz County